Barbara Stanwyck (born Ruby Catherine Stevens; July 16, 1907 – January 20, 1990) was an American actress, model and dancer. A stage, film, and television star, during her 60-year professional career she was known for her strong, realistic screen presence and versatility.  She was a favorite of directors, including Cecil B. DeMille, Fritz Lang, and Frank Capra, and made 85 films in 38 years before turning to television.

Orphaned at the age of four and partially raised in foster homes, she always worked. One of her directors, Jacques Tourneur, said of her, "She only lives for two things, and both of them are work." She made her debut on stage in the chorus as a Ziegfeld girl in 1923 at age 16, and within a few years was acting in plays. Her first lead role, which was in the hit Burlesque (1927), established her as a Broadway star. 

In 1929, she began acting in talking pictures. Frank Capra chose her for his romantic drama Ladies of Leisure (1930). This led to additional leading roles which raised her profile, such as Night Nurse (1931), Baby Face (1933), and the controversial The Bitter Tea of General Yen (1933). In 1937, she played the title role in Stella Dallas for which she earned her first Academy Award nomination for best actress. In 1939, she starred in Union Pacific. In 1941, she starred in two screwball comedies: Ball of Fire with Gary Cooper, and The Lady Eve with Henry Fonda. She received her second Academy Award nomination for Ball of Fire, and in the decades since its release The Lady Eve has come to be regarded as a comedic classic, with Stanwyck's performance called one of the best in American comedy. Other successful films during this period are Meet John Doe (1940) and You Belong to Me (1941), reteaming her with Cooper and Fonda, respectively. By 1944, Stanwyck had become the highest-paid actress in the United States. She starred with Fred MacMurray in the seminal film noir Double Indemnity (1944), playing the wife who persuades an insurance salesman to kill her husband, for which she received her third Oscar nomination. In 1945, she starred as a homemaker columnist in the hit romantic comedy Christmas in Connecticut. The next year, she portrayed the title tragic femme fatale in The Strange Love of Martha Ivers. She garnered her fourth Oscar nomination for her performance as an invalid wife in the noir-thriller Sorry, Wrong Number (1948). Stanwyck’s film career declined by the start of the 1950s, despite having a fair number of leading and major supporting roles in the decade, the most successful being Executive Suite (1954). 

She transitioned to television by the 1960s, where she won three Emmy Awards, for The Barbara Stanwyck Show (1961), the western series The Big Valley (1966), and the miniseries The Thorn Birds (1983). 

She received an Honorary Oscar in 1982, the Golden Globe Cecil B. DeMille Award in 1986 and several other honorary lifetime awards. She was ranked as the 11th greatest female star of classic American cinema by the American Film Institute.

Early life
Stanwyck was born Ruby Catherine Stevens on July 16, 1907, in Brooklyn, New York. She was the fifthand youngestchild of Kathryn  Ann (née McPhee) and Byron E. Stevens, both working-class parents. Her father, of English descent, was a native of Lanesville, Massachusetts, and her mother, of Scottish descent, was an immigrant from Sydney, Nova Scotia. She had four older siblings: three older sisters, Laura Mildred (Smith), Viola (Merkent), Mabel (Munier) and one older brother, Malcolm Byron (known as "Bert”).

When Ruby was four, her mother died of complications from a miscarriage after she was knocked off a moving streetcar in 1911 by a drunkard. Two weeks after the funeral, her father joined a work crew digging the Panama Canal and was never seen again by his family. 

Ruby and her older brother, Malcolm Byron (later nicknamed "By") Stevens, were raised by their eldest sister Laura Mildred (known as Mildred; later Mildred Smith), who died of a heart attack at age 45. When Mildred got a job as a showgirl, Ruby and Byron were placed in a series of foster homes (as many as four in a year), from which young Ruby often ran away. She attended various public schools in Brooklyn, where she received uniformly poor grades and routinely picked fights with the other students.

Ruby toured with Mildred during the summers of 1916 and 1917, and practiced her sister's routines backstage. Watching the movies of Pearl White, whom Ruby idolized, also influenced her drive to be a performer. At the age of 14, she dropped out of school, taking a package wrapping job at a Brooklyn department store. Ruby never attended high school, "although early biographical thumbnail sketches had her attending Brooklyn's famous Erasmus Hall High School."

Soon afterward, she took a filing job at the Brooklyn telephone office for $14 a week, which allowed her to become financially independent. She disliked the job; her real goal was to enter show business, even as her sister Mildred discouraged the idea. She then took a job cutting dress patterns for Vogue magazine, but customers complained about her work and she was fired. Ruby's next job was as a typist for the Jerome H. Remick Music Company; she reportedly enjoyed the work, but her continuing ambition was show business, and her sister finally gave up trying to dissuade her.

Ziegfeld girl and Broadway success

In 1923, a few months before her 16th birthday, Ruby auditioned for a place in the chorus at the Strand Roof, a nightclub over the Strand Theatre in Times Square. A few months later, she obtained a job as a dancer in the 1922 and 1923 seasons of the Ziegfeld Follies, dancing at the New Amsterdam Theater. "I just wanted to survive and eat and have a nice coat", Stanwyck said. For the next several years, she worked as a chorus girl, performing from midnight to seven a.m. at nightclubs owned by Texas Guinan. She also occasionally served as a dance instructor at a speakeasy for gays and lesbians owned by Guinan. One of her good friends during those years was pianist Oscar Levant, who described her as being "wary of sophisticates and phonies".

Billy LaHiff, who owned a popular pub frequented by showpeople, introduced Ruby in 1926 to impresario Willard Mack. Mack was casting his play The Noose, and LaHiff suggested that the part of the chorus girl be played by a real one. Mack agreed, and after a successful audition gave the part to Ruby. She co-starred with Rex Cherryman and Wilfred Lucas. As initially staged, the play was not a success. In an effort to improve it, Mack decided to expand Ruby's part to include more pathos. The Noose re-opened on October 20, 1926, and became one of the most successful plays of the season, running on Broadway for nine months and 197 performances. At the suggestion of David Belasco, Ruby changed her name to Barbara Stanwyck by combining the first name of the title character in the play Barbara Frietchie with the last name of the actress in the play, Jane Stanwyck; both were found on a 1906 theater program.

Stanwyck became a Broadway star soon afterward, when she was cast in her first leading role in Burlesque (1927). She received rave reviews, and it was a huge hit. Film actor Pat O'Brien would later say on a 1960s talk show, "The greatest Broadway show I ever saw was a play in the 1920s called 'Burlesque'." Arthur Hopkins described in his autobiography To a Lonely Boy, how he came to cast Stanwyck:
After some search for the girl, I interviewed a nightclub dancer who had just scored in a small emotional part in a play that did not run [The Noose]. She seemed to have the quality I wanted, a sort of rough poignancy. She at once displayed more sensitive, easily expressed emotion than I had encountered since Pauline Lord. She and [Hal] Skelly were the perfect team, and they made the play a great success. I had great plans for her, but the Hollywood offers kept coming. There was no competing with them. She became a picture star. She is Barbara Stanwyck.
He also called Stanwyck "The greatest natural actress of our time", noting with sadness, "One of the theater's great potential actresses was embalmed in celluloid."

Around this time, Stanwyck was given a screen test by producer Bob Kane for his upcoming 1927 silent film Broadway Nights. She lost the lead role because she could not cry in the screen test, but was given a minor part as a fan dancer. This was Stanwyck's first film appearance.

While playing in Burlesque, Stanwyck was introduced to her future husband, actor Frank Fay, by Oscar Levant. Stanwyck and Fay were married on August 26, 1928, and soon moved to Hollywood.

Film career

Stanwyck's first sound film was The Locked Door (1929), followed by Mexicali Rose, released in the same year. Neither film was successful; nonetheless, Frank Capra chose Stanwyck for his film Ladies of Leisure (1930). Her work in that production established an enduring friendship with the director and led to future roles in his films. Other prominent roles followed, among them as a nurse who saves two little girls from the villainous chauffeur (Clark Gable) in Night Nurse (1931). In Edna Ferber's novel brought to screen by William Wellman, she portrays small town teacher and valiant Midwest farm woman Selena in So Big! (1932). She followed with a performance as an ambitious woman "sleeping" her way to the top from "the wrong side of the tracks" in Baby Face (1933), a controversial pre-Code classic. In The Bitter Tea of General Yen (1933), another controversial pre-Code film by director Capra, Stanwyck portrays an idealistic Christian caught behind the lines of Chinese civil war kidnapped by warlord Nils Asther. A flop at the time, containing "mysterious-East mumbo jumbo", the lavish film is "dark stuff, and it's difficult to imagine another actress handling this ... philosophical conversion as fearlessly as Ms. Stanwyck does. She doesn't make heavy weather of it."

Regarding her pre-Code work, Mick LaSalle, movie critic for the San Francisco Chronicle said "If you've never seen Stanwyck in a pre-Code film, you've never seen Stanwyck. Never in her career, including "Double Indemnity," was she ever as hard-boiled as she was in the early 1930s. She had a wonderful quality of being both incredibly cool and yet blazingly passionate. Her cynicism was profound, and then, without warning, she would explode into shrieking, sobbing."

In Stella Dallas (1937) she plays the self-sacrificing title character who eventually allows her teenage daughter to live a better life somewhere else. She landed her first Academy Award nomination for Best Actress when she was able to portray her character as vulgar, yet sympathetic as required by the movie. Next, she played Molly Monahan in Union Pacific (1939) with Joel McCrea.  Stanwyck was reportedly one of the many actresses considered for the role of Scarlett O'Hara in Gone with the Wind (1939), although she did not receive a screen test.  In Meet John Doe she plays an ambitious newspaperwoman with Gary Cooper (1941).

In Preston Sturges's romantic comedy The Lady Eve (1941), she plays a slinky, sophisticated con-woman who "gives off an erotic charge that would straighten a boa constrictor", while falling in love with her intended mark, the guileless, wealthy herpetologist, played by Henry Fonda. Film critic David Thomson described Stanwyck as "giving one of the best American comedy performances", and she was reviewed as brilliantly versatile in "her bravura double performance" by The Guardian. The Lady Eve is among the top 100 movies of all time on Time and Entertainment Weekly's lists, and is considered to be both a great comedy and a great romantic film with its placement at #55 on the AFI's 100 Years...100 Laughs list and #26 on its 100 Years...100 Passions list.

Next, she was the extremely successful, independent doctor Helen Hunt in You Belong to Me (1941), also with Fonda. Stanwyck then played nightclub performer Sugarpuss O'Shea in the Howard Hawks directed, but Billy Wilder written comedy Ball of Fire (1941). In this update of the Snow White and Seven Dwarfs tale, she gives professor Bertram Potts (played by Gary Cooper) a better understanding of "modern English" in the performance for which she received an Academy Award nomination for Best Actress.

"That is the kind of woman that makes whole civilizations topple." -- Kathleen Howard of Stanwyck's character in Ball of Fire.

In Double Indemnity (1944), the seminal film noir thriller directed by Billy Wilder, she plays the sizzling blonde tramp/"destiny in high heels" who lures an infatuated insurance salesman (Fred MacMurray), into killing her husband.  Stanwyck brings out the cruel nature of the "grim, unflinching murderess", marking her as the "most notorious femme fatale" in the film noir genre. Her performance as the "insolent, self-possessed wife is one of the screen's definitive studies of villainy – and should (it is widely thought) have won the Oscar for Best Actress", not just been nominated. Double Indemnity is usually considered to be among the top 100 films of all time, though it did not win any of its seven Academy Award nominations. It is the #38 film of all time on the American Film Institute's list, as well as the #24 on its 100 Years...100 Thrills list and #84 on its 100 Years...100 Passions list.

She plays a columnist touted as the "greatest cook in the country" caught up in white lies while trying to pursue a romance in the comedy Christmas in Connecticut (1945). It was a hit upon release and remains a treasured holiday classic today. In 1946 she was "liquid nitrogen" as Martha, a manipulative murderess, starring with Van Heflin and newcomer Kirk Douglas in The Strange Love of Martha Ivers.  Stanwyck was also the vulnerable, invalid wife that overhears her own murder being plotted in Sorry, Wrong Number (1948) and the doomed concert pianist in The Other Love (1947). In the latter film's soundtrack, the piano music is actually being performed by Ania Dorfmann, who drilled Stanwyck for three hours a day until the actress was able to synchronize the motion of her arms and hands to match the music's tempo, giving a convincing impression that it is Stanwyck playing the piano.

Pauline Kael, a longtime film critic for The New Yorker, admired the natural appearance of Stanwyck's acting style on screen, noting that she "seems to have an intuitive understanding of the fluid physical movements that work best on camera". In reference to the actress's film work during the early sound era, Kael observed that the "[e]arly talkies sentimentality ... only emphasizes Stanwyck's remarkable modernism."

Many of her roles involve strong characters, yet Stanwyck was known for her accessibility and kindness to the backstage crew on any film set. She knew the names of many of their wives and children. Frank Capra said of Stanwyck: "She was destined to be beloved by all directors, actors, crews and extras. In a Hollywood popularity contest, she would win first prize, hands down." While working on 1954's Cattle Queen of Montana (also starring Ronald Reagan) on location in Glacier National Park, she performed some of her own stunts, including a swim in the icy lake. At the age of 50, she performed an extremely difficult stunt in Forty Guns. The scene called for her character to fall from and be dragged by a horse, and the stunt was so dangerous that the film's professional stuntman refused to perform it. She would later be named an honorary member of the Hollywood Stuntmen's Hall of Fame.

William Holden and Stanwyck were longtime friends and when they were presenting the Best Sound Oscar for 1977, he paused to pay a special tribute to her for saving his career when Holden was cast in the lead for Golden Boy (1939). After a series of unsteady daily performances, he was about to be fired, but Stanwyck staunchly defended him, successfully standing up to the film producers. Shortly after Holden's death, Stanwyck recalled the moment when receiving her honorary Oscar: "A few years ago, I stood on this stage with William Holden as a presenter. I loved him very much, and I miss him. He always wished that I would get an Oscar. And so, tonight, my golden boy, you got your wish."

Television career
As Stanwyck's film career declined during the 1950s, she moved to television. In 1958, she guest-starred in "Trail to Nowhere", an episode of the Western anthology series Dick Powell's Zane Grey Theatre, playing a wife who kills a man to avenge her husband. In 1961, she hosted an anthology drama series titled The Barbara Stanwyck Show that was not a ratings success but earned her an Emmy Award. The show ran for a total of 36 episodes. During this period, she also guest-starred on other television series such as The Untouchables and four episodes of Wagon Train.

She stepped back into film for the 1964 Elvis Presley film Roustabout, in which she plays a carnival owner.

 
The Western television series The Big Valley, which was broadcast on ABC from 1965 to 1969, made Stanwyck one of the most popular actresses on television, winning her another Emmy. She was billed in the series' opening credits as Miss Barbara Stanwyck for her role as Victoria, the widowed matriarch of the wealthy Barkley family.

In 1983, Stanwyck won an Emmy for The Thorn Birds, her third such award. In 1985, she made three guest appearances in the primetime soap opera Dynasty prior to the launch of its short-lived spinoff series The Colbys, in which she starred alongside Charlton Heston, Stephanie Beacham and Katharine Ross. Unhappy with the experience, Stanwyck remained with the series for only the first season, and her role as Constance Colby Patterson would be her last. It was rumored that Earl Hamner Jr., former producer of The Waltons, had initially wanted Stanwyck for the role of Angela Channing in the 1980s soap opera Falcon Crest, and she turned it down, with the role going to her friend Jane Wyman, but Hamner assured Wyman that it was only a rumor.

Personal life

Marriages and relationships

While playing in The Noose, Stanwyck reportedly fell in love with her married co-star Rex Cherryman. When Cherryman took ill in early 1928, his doctor advised him to take a sea voyage, so Cherryman set sail for Le Havre intending to continue on to Paris, where he and Stanwyck had arranged to meet. While at sea he contracted septic poisoning and died shortly after arriving in France at the age of 31.

On August 26, 1928, Stanwyck married her Burlesque co-star Frank Fay. She and Fay later claimed that they had disliked each other at first, but became close after Cherryman's death. Fay was Catholic so Stanwyck converted for their marriage. She was reportedly unable to have children, and one biographer alleges the cause of her infertility was a botched abortion at the age of 15 that resulted in complications. After moving to Hollywood, the couple adopted a ten-month-old boy on December 5, 1932. They named him Dion, later amending the name to Anthony Dion, nicknamed Tony. The marriage was troubled; Fay's successful Broadway career did not translate to the big screen, whereas Stanwyck achieved Hollywood stardom. Fay was reportedly physically abusive to Stanwyck, especially when he was inebriated. Some claim that the marriage was the basis for dialogue written by William Wellman, a friend of the couple, for A Star Is Born (1937) starring Janet Gaynor and Fredric March. The couple divorced on December 30, 1935. Stanwyck won custody of their son, whom she raised with a strict, authoritarian hand and demanding expectations. Stanwyck and her son became estranged after his childhood, meeting only a few times after he became an adult. He died in 2006. Wrote Richard Corliss, the child "resembled her in just one respect: both were, effectively, orphans."

In 1936, while making the film His Brother's Wife (1936), Stanwyck became involved with her co-star, Robert Taylor. Rather than a torrid romance, their relationship was more one of mentor and pupil. Stanwyck served as support and adviser to the younger Taylor, who had come from a small Nebraska town; she guided his career and acclimated him to the sophisticated Hollywood culture. The couple began living together, sparking newspaper reports. Stanwyck was hesitant to remarry after the failure of her first marriage, but their 1939 marriage was arranged with the help of Taylor's studio, Metro-Goldwyn-Mayer, a common practice in Hollywood's golden age. Louis B. Mayer had insisted that Stanwyck and Taylor marry and went as far as presiding over arrangements at the wedding. Stanwyck and Taylor enjoyed time together outdoors during the early years of their marriage and owned acres of prime West Los Angeles property. Their large ranch and home in the Mandeville Canyon section of Brentwood, Los Angeles, is still referred to by the locals as "the old Robert Taylor ranch".

Stanwyck and Taylor mutually decided in 1950 to divorce and, at his insistence, she proceeded with the official filing of the papers. There have been many rumors regarding the cause of the divorce, but after World War II Taylor attempted to create a life away from the entertainment industry, and Stanwyck did not share that goal. Taylor allegedly had extramarital affairs, and unsubstantiated rumors suggested that Stanwyck had also. After the divorce, they remained friendly and acted together in Stanwyck's last feature film, The Night Walker (1964). She never remarried. According to her friend and Big Valley co-star Linda Evans, Stanwyck cited Taylor as the love of her life. She took his death in 1969 very hard, and took a long break from film and television work.

Stanwyck was one of the best-liked actresses in Hollywood and maintained friendships with many of her fellow actors (as well as crew members of her films and TV shows), including Joel McCrea and his wife Frances Dee, George Brent, Robert Preston, Henry Fonda (who had a lifelong crush on her), James Stewart, Linda Evans, Joan Crawford, Jack Benny and his wife Mary Livingstone, William Holden, Gary Cooper, and Fred MacMurray. During filming of To Please a Lady, Stanwyck refused to leave her African-American maid Harriet Coray in a hotel only for African-American people and insisted that Harriet stay in the same hotel as she did. After much pressure from Stanwyck, Coray was allowed to stay in the best hotel in Indianapolis with Stanwyck and the rest of the cast and crew.

Stanwyck, at age 45, had a four-year romantic affair with 22-year-old actor Robert Wagner that had begun on the set of Titanic (1953) before Stanwyck ended the relationship. The affair is described in Wagner's 2008 memoir Pieces of My Heart. In the 1950s, Stanwyck also had a one-night stand with Farley Granger, which he wrote about in his autobiography Include Me Out: My Life from Goldwyn to Broadway (2007).

Political views
A conservative Republican, Stanwyck opposed the presidency of Franklin D. Roosevelt. She felt that if someone from her disadvantaged background had risen to success, others should be able to prosper without government intervention or assistance. For Stanwyck, "hard work with the prospect of rich reward was the American way." She became an early member of the Motion Picture Alliance for the Preservation of American Ideals (MPA) after its founding in 1944. The mission of this group was to "combat ... subversive methods [used in the industry] to undermine and change the American way of life." It opposed both communist and fascist influences in Hollywood. She publicly supported the investigations of the House Un-American Activities Committee, and her husband Robert Taylor testified as a friendly witness. Stanwyck supported Thomas E. Dewey in the 1944 and 1948 United States presidential elections.

A fan of Objectivist author Ayn Rand, Stanwyck persuaded Warner Bros. head Jack L. Warner to purchase the rights to The Fountainhead before it became a bestseller, and she wrote Rand with her admiration of Atlas Shrugged.

Religion
Stanwyck was originally a Protestant, and was baptized in June 1916 by the Reverend J. Frederic Berg of the Protestant Dutch Reform Church. She later converted to Roman Catholicism when she married first husband Frank Fay but does not appear to have remained an adherent after the marriage ended.

Brother
Stanwyck's older brother, Malcolm Byron Stevens (1905–1964), became an actor, using the name Bert Stevens. He appeared mostly in supporting roles, often uncredited. He appeared in two films that starred Stanwyck: The File on Thelma Jordon and No Man of Her Own, both released in 1950.

Later years and death
Stanwyck's retirement years were active, with charity work outside the limelight. 

In 1981, in her home in the exclusive Trousdale section of Beverly Hills, she was awakened during the night by an intruder who struck her on the head with his flashlight, forced her into a closet, and absconded with $40,000 in jewels.

In 1982, while filming The Thorn Birds, Stanwyck inhaled special-effects smoke on the set that may have caused her to contract bronchitis, which was compounded by her cigarette-smoking habit. She began smoking at the age of nine and stopped just four years before her death.

Stanwyck died on January 20, 1990, at the age of 82, from congestive heart failure and chronic obstructive pulmonary disease at Saint John's Health Center in Santa Monica, California. She had indicated that she wanted no funeral service. In accordance with her wishes, her remains were cremated and the ashes scattered from a helicopter over Lone Pine, California, where she had made some of her Western films.

Filmography

Awards and nominations

References

Citations

Bibliography

 Bachardy, Don. Stars in My Eyes. Madison: University of Wisconsin Press, 2000. .
 Balio, Tino. Grand Design: Hollywood as a Modern Business Enterprise, 1930–1939. Berkeley: University of California Press, 1995. .
 Bosworth, Patricia. Jane Fonda: The Private Life of a Public Woman. New York: Houghton, Mifflin, Harcourt, 2011. .
 Callahan, Dan. Barbara Stanwyck: The Miracle Woman. Jackson: University Press of Mississippi, 2012. .
 Capua, Michelangelo. William Holden: A Biography. Jefferson, NC: McFarland Press, 2010. .
 
 Chierichetti, David and Edith Head. Edith Head: The Life and Times of Hollywood's Celebrated Costume Designer. New York: HarperCollins, 2003. .
 Diorio, Al. Barbara Stanwyck: A Biography. New York: Coward, McCann, 1984. .
 Frost, Jennifer. Hedda Hopper's Hollywood: Celebrity Gossip and American Conservatism. New York: NYU Press, 2011. .
 Granger, Farley and Robert Calhoun. Include Me Out: My Life from Goldwyn to Broadway. New York: St. Martin's Press, 2007. .
 Hall, Dennis. American Icons: An Encyclopedia of the People, Places, and Things that have Shaped our Culture. Westport, Connecticut: Greenwood Publishing Group, 2006. .
 Hannsberry, Karen Burroughs. Femme Noir: Bad Girls of Film. Jefferson, NC: McFarland Press, 2009. .
 Hirsch, Foster. The Dark Side of the Screen: Film Noir. New York: Da Capo Press, 2008. .
 Hopkins, Arthur. To a Lonely Boy. New York: Doubleday, Doran & Co., First edition 1937.
 Kael, Pauline. 5001 Nights At The Movies. New York: Henry Holt, 1991. .
 Lesser, Wendy. His Other Half: Men Looking at Women Through Art. Boston: Harvard University Press, 1992. .
 Madsen, Axel. Stanwyck: A Biography. New York: HarperCollins, 1994. .
 Metzger, Robert P. Reagan: American Icon. Philadelphia: University of Pennsylvania Press, 1989. .
 Muller, Eddie. Dark City: The Lost World of Film Noir. New York: St. Martin's Griffin, 1998. .
 Nassour, Ellis and Beth A. Snowberger. "Stanwyck, Barbara". American National Biography Online (subscription only), February 2000. Retrieved: July 1, 2009.
 Peikoff, Leonard. Letters of Ayn Rand. New York: Plume, 1997. .
 "The Rumble: An Off-the-Ball Look at Your Favorite Sports Celebrities". New York Post, December 31, 2006. Retrieved: June 16, 2009.
 Ross, Steven J. Hollywood Left and Right: How Movie Stars Shaped American Politics. Oxford, UK: Oxford University Press, 2011. .
 Schackel, Sandra. "Barbara Stanwyck: Uncommon Heroine". Back in the Saddle: Essays on Western Film and Television Actors. Jefferson, NC: McFarland Publishing, 1998. .
 Smith, Ella. Starring Miss Barbara Stanwyck. New York: Random House, 1985. .
 Thomson, David. Gary Cooper (Great Stars). New York: Faber & Faber, 2010. .
 Wagner, Robert and Scott Eyman. Pieces of My Heart: A Life. New York: HarperEntertainment, 2008. .
 Wayne, Jane. Life and Loves of Barbara Stanwyck. London: JR Books Ltd, 2009. .
 
 Wilson, Victoria. A Life of Barbara Stanwyck: Steel-True 1907–1940. New York: Simon & Schuster, 2013. .

External links

 
 
Barbara Stanwyck Papers at the University of Wyoming – American Heritage Center
Blog entries based on the AHC archives related to Barbara Stanwyck
 
 video: 
 Barbara Stanwyck at Virtual History
 That Old Feeling: Ruby in the Rough and The Four Phases of Eve by Richard Corliss for Time magazine, 2001
 Saluting Stanwyck: A Life On Film Los Angeles Times, 1987
 Lady Be Good – A centenary season of Barbara Stanwyck by Anthony Lane for The New Yorker, 2007  
 Bert Stevens at IMDb

1907 births
1990 deaths
20th-century American actresses
AFI Life Achievement Award recipients
Academy Honorary Award recipients
Actresses from New York City
American anti-communists
American anti-fascists
American female models
American film actresses
American people of Canadian descent
American people of English descent
American people of Scottish descent
American radio actresses
American television actresses
Best Supporting Actress Golden Globe (television) winners
California Republicans
Cecil B. DeMille Award Golden Globe winners
Conservatism in the United States
Converts to Roman Catholicism from Calvinism
Respiratory disease deaths in California
Deaths from chronic obstructive pulmonary disease
Deaths from congestive heart failure
Outstanding Performance by a Lead Actress in a Drama Series Primetime Emmy Award winners
Outstanding Performance by a Lead Actress in a Miniseries or Movie Primetime Emmy Award winners
Paramount Pictures contract players
People from Clinton Hill, Brooklyn
People from Flatbush, Brooklyn
People from Mandeville Canyon, Los Angeles
People from Midwood, Brooklyn
Screen Actors Guild Life Achievement Award
Western (genre) film actresses
Western (genre) television actors
Ziegfeld girls